Tetra is the name of many species of freshwater fish in the family Characidae from Africa, Central America and South America.

Tetra may also refer to:


Arts and entertainment
 Tetra (album) (stylised as Tetr4), the first album from the French break-beat band C2C
 Tetra, an alias for Princess Zelda in The Legend of Zelda: The Wind Waker and The Legend of Zelda: Phantom Hourglass
 Tetra Galaxy, the fictional galaxy in the game Metroid Prime Hunters

Businesses
 Tetra (company), a supplier of aquarium equipment and fish food
 Tetra Pak, a multinational food packaging and processing company of Swedish origin
 Tetra Tech, an environmental engineering and resource management firm

Science and technology
 Terrestrial Trunked Radio (TETRA), a standard for encrypted radio networks
 Tetra (monkey), a rhesus macaque that was the first successfully birthed primate created via an artificial cloning technique
 Tetra (unit), a proposed unit of information by Donald Knuth denoting 32 bits
 Mitsubishi TETRA, a concept car first exhibited in 1997

Other uses
 Tetra-, a numerical prefix for 4
 Quadriplegia, also known as tetraplegia, shortened to tetra

See also
 
 Humbert Tétras, a French ultralight aircraft

ca:Zelda#Tetra